Victor Godoi (born March 31, 1975) is a retired Argentine boxer.

Professional career

He made his professional debut on October 13, 1995, in his debut he knocked Pedro Echiguay in the first round. By the end of 1997 he had amassed a record of 24-1. He defeated, among others, former world title contenders, Victor Fuentealba and Alli Galvez. On November 7, 1998, he earned the chance to fight for the interim WBO super flyweight title, his rival was Mexican Pedro Morquecho whom Godoi beat via a split decision. After Johnny Tapia moved up to bantamweight Godoi became the full champion. Godoi lost the title in his first defense of the title against Diego Morales in what would be his only fight outside Argentina. After losing the title, he fought five more times going 2-3, he ended his career in 2005 when he lost to Jose Saez.

See also 
List of super-flyweight boxing champions

External links

   

|-

1975 births
Living people
Flyweight boxers
Super-flyweight boxers
Bantamweight boxers
World super-flyweight boxing champions
World Boxing Organization champions
Argentine male boxers